Fred "Freddy" Smith (birth registered second quarter 1935  – 24 April 2004) was an English professional rugby league footballer who played in the 1950s and 1960s.

Background
Smith was born in Gorton, Manchester, Lancashire, England, and he died in Wakefield, West Yorkshire, England.

Playing career

International honours
Fred Smith was a non-playing substitute for Great Britain while at Wakefield Trinity.

County honours
Fred Smith represented Yorkshire (despite being born in Lancashire) while at Wakefield Trinity.

Championship final appearances
Fred Smith played , i.e. number 2, and scored a try in Wakefield Trinity's 3–27 defeat by Wigan in the Rugby Football League Championship Final during the 1959–60 season at Odsal Stadium, Bradford on Saturday 21 May 1960.

Challenge Cup Final appearances
Fred Smith played , i.e. number 2, and scored a try in Wakefield Trinity's 38–5 victory over Hull F.C. in the 1959–60 Challenge Cup Final during the 1959–60 season at Wembley Stadium, London on Saturday 14 May 1960, and played in the 12–6 victory over Huddersfield in the 1961–62 Challenge Cup Final during the 1961–62 season at Wembley Stadium, London on Saturday 12 May 1962.

County Cup Final appearances
Fred Smith played , i.e. number 2, and scored 2-tries in Wakefield Trinity's 25–3 victory over Hunslet in the 1956–57 Yorkshire County Cup Final during the 1956–57 season at Headingley Rugby Stadium, Leeds on Saturday 20 October 1956, played  in the 20–24 defeat by Leeds in the 1958–59 Yorkshire County Cup Final during the 1958–59 season at Odsal Stadium, Bradford on Saturday 18 October 1958, played , and scored a try in the 16–10 victory over Huddersfield in the 1960–61 Yorkshire County Cup Final during the 1960–61 season at Headingley Rugby Stadium, Leeds on Saturday 29 October 1960, and played , and scored a try in the 19–9 victory over Leeds in the 1961–62 Yorkshire County Cup Final during the 1961–62 season at Odsal Stadium, Bradford on Saturday 11 November 1961.

Notable tour matches
Fred Smith played , i.e. number 2, in Wakefield Trinity's 17–12 victory over Australia in the 1956–57 Kangaroo tour of Great Britain and France match at Belle Vue, Wakefield on Monday 10 December 1956.

Transfer from Leeds to Wakefield Trinity
Fred Smith was transferred from Leeds to Wakefield Trinity in January 1956, with Don Robinson going the other way. In addition, Wakefield Trinity also received £3,000 (based on increases in average earnings, this would be approximately £155,300 in 2013).

Career records
Fred Smith's record for the most tries for Wakefield Trinity in a match set against Keighley in 1959 with 7-tries has since been equalled by Keith Slater in 1971, and the record for the most tries for Wakefield Trinity in a season set during the 1959–60 season with 38-tries has since been equalled by David Smith in the 1973–74 season, but over fifty years on, both of Fred Smith's records for Wakefield Trinity remain unbeaten.

Contemporaneous article extract
"Fred Smith: When Don Robinson moved to Leeds in January 1956, Fred Smith came to Belle Vue as part of the transfer agreement. In his first full season of 1956/57 he scored 30 tries – only one other player had ever scored more for the club. In 1958/59 he extended Denis Boocker's and Neil Fox's joint record to 37 and in 1959/60 took his seasons total to 38. Also holds the record of tries in a match – seven against Keighley in 1958/9".

References

External links

Search for "Smith" at rugbyleagueproject.org
Rugby League Cup Final 1960
Wakefield Win Cup 1962

1935 births
2004 deaths
English rugby league players
Leeds Rhinos players
People from Gorton
Place of death missing
Rugby league players from Manchester
Rugby league wingers
Wakefield Trinity players
Yorkshire rugby league team players